The following lists events that happened during 2009 in New Zealand.

Population
 Estimated population as of 31 December: 4,332,100
 Increase since 31 December 2008: 51,900 (1.21%)
 Males per 100 Females: 95.8

Incumbents

Regal and vice-regal
Head of State – Elizabeth II
Governor-General – Anand Satyanand

Government
2009 was the first full year of the election of the 49th New Zealand Parliament.

Speaker of the House – Lockwood Smith
Prime Minister – John Key
Deputy Prime Minister – Bill English
Minister of Finance – Bill English
Minister of Foreign Affairs – Murray McCully

Other party leaders
Labour – Phil Goff (Leader of the Opposition since 11 November 2008)
Act – Rodney Hide, since 13 June 2004
Greens – Metiria Turei (since 30 May 2009) and Russel Norman (since 3 June 2006)
Māori Party – Tariana Turia and Pita Sharples, both since 7 July 2004

Judiciary
Chief Justice — Sian Elias

Main centre leaders
Mayor of Auckland – John Banks, since October 2007
Mayor of Tauranga – Stuart Crosby, since October 2004
Mayor of Hamilton – Bob Simcock, since May 2007
Mayor of Wellington – Kerry Prendergast, since October 2001
Mayor of Christchurch – Bob Parker, since October 2007
Mayor of Dunedin – Peter Chin, since October 2004

Events

January

February
 27 February: Prime Minister John Key proposes a nine-day working fortnight, to counter the Late-2000s recession.

March
 6 March: Retrial of David Bain begins in the Christchurch High Court
 20 March: Roads of National Significance announced
 25 March: Former Prime Minister Helen Clark is appointed Head of the United Nations Development Program; her resignation necessitates the 2009 Mount Albert by-election
 26 March: the Royal Commission on Auckland Governance recommends eight Auckland Region local government bodies merge to form a "supercity".

April
25 April: First indication of potential for Flu infection with return of students from Mexico, see 2009 flu pandemic in New Zealand

May
 7 May: Gunman Jan Molenaar shoots three police officers executing a routine cannabis search warrant, as well as a neighbour who tried to assist them. He killed Senior Constable Leonard Snee and seriously injured the others, and after a two-day siege, he was found dead.

June
 3 June: A police investigation leads to MP Richard Worth resigning ministerial portfolios including Minister of Internal Affairs "for personal reasons", with Prime Minister John Key saying, "If he hadn't resigned I would have sacked him".
5 June: David Bain is found not guilty of the murder of five family members.
12 June: Five members of the family of Janet Moses were found guilty of manslaughter after performing a fatal exorcism.
24 June: A NZ$36.1 million first division jackpot in the New Zealand Lotteries Commission's Big Wednesday game is won by a Masterton-based lottery syndicate of four: the largest single lottery prize won in New Zealand.

July
 4 July: The Ministry of Health confirms the first three deaths in New Zealand from the 2009 flu pandemic.
 15 July: The magnitude 7.8 2009 Fiordland earthquake strikes at 9:22 pm, 90 km north-west of Tuatapere.

August
 4 August: Former MP Phillip Field found guilty on bribery, corruption and obstruction of justice charges.
 8–9 August: New Zealand's first Telethon for 16 years raises $2 million for the KidsCan Stand Tall Trust.

October
30 October – Electricity supply to Northland and northern Auckland is cut for three hours, affecting 280,000 customers, after a forklift carrying a shipping container hits the only major transmission line supplying the region.

November
 30 November: Atea-1, the first New Zealand rocket into space, is launched from Great Mercury Island.

Holidays and observances

 6 February - Waitangi Day (Friday)
 10 April/13 April Good Friday/Easter Monday
 25 April - ANZAC Day (Saturday)
 1 June - Queen's Birthday Monday
 24 June - Matariki (Wednesday)
 26 October - Labour Day Monday

Arts and literature

Awards

Music
May - New Zealand Music Month
Vodafone Album of the year: Ladyhawke - Ladyhawke
Vodafone Single of the year: Ladyhawke - My Delerium
Best group: Midnight Youth
Best male solo artist: Savage
Best female solo artist: Ladyhawke
Breakthrough artist of the year: Ladyhawke
Best Music Video: Chris Graham – Brother (Smashproof)
Best Rock Album: Midnight Youth – "The Brave Don't Run"
Best Urban/Hip Hop Album: Ladi 6 – "Time Is Not Much"
Best Aotearoa Roots Album: Fat Freddy's Drop – "Dr Boondigga and the Big BW"
Best dance/electronica album: Ladyhawke - Ladyhawke
Best gospel/Christian album: Mumsdollar - Ruins
Best classical album:  David Bremner – "Gung Ho"
The Vodafone People's Choice Award, voted by New Zealand music fans: Smashproof
Highest Selling NZ Single: Smashproof feat. Gin - Brother
Highest Selling NZ Album: The Feelers - The Best: 1998 - 2008"
Radio Airplay Record of the Year: Tiki Taane- "Always on my mind"

Performing arts

 Benny Award presented by the Variety Artists Club of New Zealand to Eddie Low MNZM.

Television

FilmEarth Whisperers/Papatuanuku''

Internet

Sport

Horse racing

Harness racing
 Auckland Trotting Cup: Auckland Reactor

Thoroughbred racing
 Katie Lee becomes the first racehorse to win both the New Zealand 2000 Guineas and the New Zealand 1000 Guineas.

Soccer
The 2009 Chatham Cup is won by Wellington Olympic, who beat Three Kings United 2–1 in the final.

Shooting
Ballinger Belt – 
 David Rich (Australia)
 Mike Collings (Te Puke), second, top New Zealander

Births
 27 August – Sacred Falls, Thoroughbred racehorse
 4 September – Habibi, Thoroughbred racehorse
 18 November – It's A Dundeel, Thoroughbred racehorse
 20 November – Prince of Penzance, Thoroughbred racehorse

Deaths

January
 4 January – Sonny Fai, rugby league player (born 1988)
 8 January – Wally Williams, water polo player (born 1921)
 17 January – Mike Parkinson, rugby union player (born 1948)
 20 January – Lyn Forster, arachnologist (born 1925)
 26 January – Gerry Merito, entertainer (born 1938)
 26 January – Don Ladner, rugby league player (born 1948)

February
 4 February – Antonie Dixon, convicted murderer (born 1968)
 27 February – Kilmeny Niland, artist and illustrator (born 1950)

March
 2 March – Robert Bruce, professional wrestler and talent agent (born 1943)
 9 March – Graham Mexted, rugby union player (born 1927)
 10 March – Dell Bandeen, netball player (born 1922)
 12 March – Mary Batchelor, politician (born 1927)
 13 March – Geoff Moon, veterinary surgeon, ornithologist and photographer (born 1915)
 21 March – Beach Towel, standardbred racehorse (foaled 1987)
 24 March – Denis Miller, air force bomber and airline pilot (born 1918)

April
 1 April – Kevin Briscoe, rugby union player (born 1936)
 11 April – James Brodie, geologist, oceanographer and amateur historian and philatelist (born 1920)
 17 April – Richard Sutton, chess player and legal academic (born 1938)
 26 April – Sir Pupuke Robati, Cook Islands politician (born 1925)
 27 April – John Bollard, lawyer, environment court judge (born 1940)

May
 1 May – Sunline, thoroughbred racehorse (foaled 1995)
 3 May – Percy Marunui Murphy, soldier and politician, first Māori mayor (born 1924)
 12 May – Dame Heather Begg, opera singer (born 1932)
 23 May
 Jack McNab, rugby union player, coach and administrator (born 1924)
 Sir Tangaroa Tangaroa, Cook Islands politician (born 1921)
 30 May – Ferris de Joux, automotive design, engineer and constructor (born 1935)

June
 7 June – Keith Steele, cricketer and lawyer (born 1951)
 8 June – Taini Morrison, kapa haka leader (born 1958)
 12 June – Ivan Lichter, thoracic surgeon and palliative care pioneer (born 1918)
 19 June – Ron Crocombe, Pacific studies academic (born 1929)
 28 June – Tom Paulay, earthquake engineer (born 1923)
 30 June – Joan Wiffen, amateur paleontologist (born 1922)

July
 3 July – Frank Devine, newspaper editor and journalist (born 1931)
 7 July – Ian Grey, rugby league player (born 1931)
 11 July – 
 Seddon Bennington, museum administrator (born 1947)
 Cyril Paskell, rugby league player (born 1927)
 14 July – Bill Young, politician and diplomat (born 1913)
 18 July – Graham Stanton, New Testament scholar (born 1940)
 19 July – Ces Mountford, rugby league player and coach (born 1919)
 20 July
 Tom Hellaby, cricketer (born 1958)
 Hew McLeod, historian (born 1932)
 25 July – Lorrie Pickering, politician (born 1919)
 30 July –
 Julian Dashper, artist (born 1960)
 Diggeress Te Kanawa, tohunga raranga (born 1920)

August
 7 August
 Jack Laird, potter (born 1920)
 Eru Potaka-Dewes, actor, Māori religious leader and activist (born 1939)
 16 August – Alistair Campbell, poet, playwright and novelist (born 1925)
 18 August – Rufus Rogers, politician (born 1913)
 21 August – Reg King, association football player (born 1927)
 24 August – Kashin, elephant (born 1968)
 26 August – Sir Jack Harris, 2nd Baronet, businessman (born 1906)
 29 August – Bob Parker, rower (born 1934)
 30 August – Percy Tetzlaff, rugby union player (born 1920)

September
 8 September – Ahmed Said Musa Patel, Muslim religious leader (born 1937)
 9 September – Dame Patricia Bergquist, zoology and anatomy academic (born 1933)
 11 September – John Pattison, pilot, Battle of Britain veteran (born 1917)
 12 September – Helen Wily, mathematician (born 1921)
 20 September – Ken Hough, dual international cricketer and association footballer (born 1928)
 24 September – Sir Howard Morrison, entertainer (born 1935)
 26 September – Paul Medhurst, track cyclist (born 1953)
 27 September – Murray Smith, politician (born 1941)

October
 3 October – Leigh Davis, writer (born 1955)
 4 October – Roger Green, archaeologist (born 1932)
 9 October – Noel Bowden, rugby union player (born 1926)
 13 October – Betty Clegg, watercolour artist (born 1926)
 14 October – Martyn Sanderson, actor, filmmaker and poet (born 1938)
 17 October – Dame Doreen Blumhardt, potter, ceramicist and arts educator (born 1914)
 31 October – Tim Bickerstaff, broadcaster, newspaper columnist and author (born 1942)

November
 4 November – Sir Don Beaven, diabetes researcher (born 1924)
 5 November – Adam Firestorm, professional wrestler (born 1976)
 15 November – Tia Barrett, diplomat (born 1947)
 19 November – Pat Mackie, miner and trade unionist (born 1914)
 29 November – Bill Hunt, alpine skier (born 1929)
 30 November – Elva Simpson, netball player (born 1936)

December
 3 December – Brian Mason, geochemist and mineralogist (born 1917)
 6 December – Eldred Stebbing, record label founder and owner (born 1921)
 8 December – Bub Bridger, poet and short-story writer (born 1924)
 20 December – John Veitch, cricketer (born 1937)
 29 December – Paul Sapsford, rugby union player (born 1949)
 30 December – Jacqueline Sturm, poet and short-story writer (born 1927)

See also
List of years in New Zealand
Timeline of New Zealand history
History of New Zealand
Military history of New Zealand
Timeline of the New Zealand environment
Timeline of New Zealand's links with Antarctica

References

External links

 
New Zealand
New Zealand
Years of the 21st century in New Zealand
2000s in New Zealand